State Route 240 (SR 240) is a  southeast-northwest state highway located in the west-central part of the U.S. state of Georgia. It travels through portions of Macon, Schley, Marion, and Talbot counties.

Route description
SR 240 begins at an intersection with SR 26 in Fountainville, which is west-southwest of Oglethorpe, in Macon County. The route runs north, and then curves to the west, through rural portions of the county. It enters Schley County, where it intersects US 19/SR 3 in the community of Murrays Crossroads. It then curves to the northwest, and enters Marion County. SR 240 intersects SR 137 in Tazewell. The route then curves to the northeast to an intersection with the southern terminus of its special route, SR 240 Connector. A short distance later, the route meets SR 127 in the unincorporated community of Five Points. It then heads north and gradually curves to the north-west until it enters Talbot County and meets its northern terminus, an intersection with SR 96/SR 540 in Geneva.

No section of SR 240 is part of the National Highway System.

History
SR 240 was established in 1946 along an alignment from Fountainville to Tazewell. By 1960, the section from the Macon-Schley County line to Tazewell was paved. By 1963, the remainder of the original segment of the road, Fountainville to the Macon-Schley County line, was paved. Also, it was extended, and paved, all the way to Geneva.

Major intersections

Marion County connector route

State Route 240 Connector (SR 240 Conn.) is a brief connector route that travels from its southern terminus at the SR 240 mainline, south of Five Points northward to SR 127 northeast of Five Points.

There is no section of SR 240 Conn. that is included as a part of the National Highway System, a system of routes determined to be the most important for the nation's economy, mobility and defense.

See also

References

External links

240
Transportation in Macon County, Georgia
Transportation in Schley County, Georgia
Transportation in Marion County, Georgia
Transportation in Talbot County, Georgia